At least two ships of the Royal Navy have been named HMS Celandine :

  was an  launched in 1916 and scrapped in 1923.
  was a  launched in 1940 and scrapped in 1948

Royal Navy ship names